Geoffrey Shugen Arnold is Rōshi of the Mountains and Rivers Order (MRO) founded by John Daido Loori, from whom Shugen received shiho, or dharma transmission, in July 1997. As a lineage holder in the Sōtō tradition, Shugen currently serves as head of MRO and abbot of Zen Mountain Monastery in Mt. Tremper, New York, where he serves as the full-time resident teacher. Trained as a musician, Shugen was introduced to and began practicing Zen meditation in 1975. He began his formal training at Zen Mountain Monastery in 1984, and received tokudo, full monastic ordination, in 1988. Shugen's teachings have appeared in various Buddhist publications, including Buddhadharma: The Practitioner's Quarterly, The Mountain Record and in The Best Buddhist Writing 2005 and 2009. He is the author of O, Beautiful End, a collection of Zen memorial poems, published by Dharma Communications in 2012.

Shugen Roshi has given shiho or dharma transmission to Ron Hogen Green, Sensei; Jody Hojin Kimmel, Sensei; and Vanessa Zuisei Goddard, Sensei.

See also
Buddhism in the United States
Timeline of Zen Buddhism in the United States

Notes

References

External links
 Mountains and Rivers Order of Zen Buddhism
 Shugen Sensei interviewed by PBS

Soto Zen Buddhists
Zen Buddhist abbots
American Zen Buddhists
Living people
1957 births